<onlyinclude>

April 2022

See also

References

killings by law enforcement officers
 04